Noufal PN (born 30 October 2000) is an Indian professional footballer who plays as a winger for I-League club Gokulam Kerala.

Career
He was the part of Kerala football team they won 2021–22 Santosh Trophy

Club career

Gokulam Kerala
He  signed by his hometown club Gokulam Kerala FC On 15th September 2022. he played his first match against Mohammedan Sporting in match against Aizawl on 25 February 2023 he assisted for two goals and  named Man of the Match

Career statistics

Club

Honours
Kerala
 2021–22 Santosh Trophy:

References

2000 births
Living people
Indian footballers
Sportspeople from Kozhikode
Footballers from Kerala
Association football wingers
Gokulam Kerala FC players
I-League players